The Association of Historians of Moldova is a professional association of historians in Moldova.

Overview 
The Association of Historians of Moldova was formed on June 18, 1989; Pavel Parasca was the first president.

Sergiu Musteaţă is the president of the association. The leadership is formed by Ion Negrei, Gheorghe Postică, Anatol Petrencu, Gheorghe Palade, Gheorghe Negru, Demir Dragnev, Daniela Buga, Maria Danilov, Igor Cașu, Mihai Taşcă, Viorica Negrei, Gheorghe E. Cojocaru.

External links 
 Asociaţia Istoricilor din Republica Moldova

History organizations
 
Organizations established in 1989
Professional associations based in Moldova